is a Japanese light novel series written by Tsuyoshi Fujitaka. The series originated on the Shōsetsuka ni Narō website, before being published in print with illustrations by Chisato Naruse by Earth Star Entertainment from October 2016 to March 2023 for 14 volumes. A manga adaptation, illustrated by Hanamaru Nanto, began serialization in Comic Earth Star in March 2018. As of December 2022, the series' individual chapters have been collected into eight volumes. An anime television series adaptation has been announced.

Plot
Yogiri Takatou's school bus was summoned to another world, by a Sage who shows just how horrible she and the world is by killing the adults for petty reasons and telling the students they are to be trained as sages to fight demons. She only takes the gifted ones, leaving the rest to die. 

Yogiri looks for a way back with his classmate Tomochia Dannora; but his apathy to the oddity unnerved Tomochia. In truth, Yogiri is not a normal kid; he can kill anything he wishes just by willing it.

Media

Light novel
Written by Tsuyoshi Fujitaka, the series was serialized on the novel posting website Shōsetsuka ni Narō from February 21, 2016 to March 15, 2023. It was later acquired by Earth Star Entertainment, who have published the series in print with illustrations by Chisato Naruse from October 15, 2016 to March 15, 2023 for 14 volumes.

At Anime Expo Lite in 2020, J-Novel Club announced that they licensed the light novel for English publication. At Anime NYC 2022, J-Novel announced that the light novel will get a print release by Yen Press.

Volume list

Manga
A manga adaptation, titled My Instant Death Ability Is So Overpowered, No One in This Other World Stands a Chance Against Me! —AΩ—, illustrated by Hanamaru Nanto began serialization in Comic Earth Star on March 30, 2018. As of December 2022, the series' individual chapters have been collected into eight tankōbon volumes.

In July 2021, J-Novel Club announced that they also licensed the manga adaptation for English publication. At Anime NYC 2022, J-Novel Club announced that the manga adaptation will also be released in print by Yen Press.

Volume list

Anime
An anime television series adaptation was announced on December 1, 2022.

References

External links
  
  
 

2016 Japanese novels
Adventure anime and manga
Anime and manga based on light novels
Comedy anime and manga
Earth Star Entertainment manga
Fantasy anime and manga
Isekai anime and manga
Isekai novels and light novels
J-Novel Club books
Japanese fantasy novels
Japanese webcomics
Light novels
Light novels first published online
Shōnen manga
Shōsetsuka ni Narō
Upcoming anime television series
Webcomics in print
Yen Press titles